The Suburbans is a 1999 American comedy-drama film that satirizes the 1980s revival hype around the turn of the 21st century. It stars Donal Lardner Ward, Craig Bierko, Will Ferrell and Tony Guma as one-hit wonder band the Suburbans and Jennifer Love Hewitt as a record company executive who wants to re-establish the band's claim to fame. Ward also co-wrote and directed the film.

The Suburbans premiered at the Sundance Film Festival on January 25, 1999. It was released on a very limited number of screens (11) on October 29 of the same year, and grossing $11,130, is considered to have failed commercially. Of ten reviews counted at Rotten Tomatoes, all ten are negative.

Plot 
In 1998, Danny, Mitch, Gil and Rory, who were once a long-forgotten, early 1980s one-hit wonder band, the Suburbans, reunite to perform their only hit single at Gil's wedding. After the gig, Cate, an up-and-coming record company executive, approaches them and suggests to shoot a pay-per-view reunion show that would eventually re-establish the band's claim to fame. The four, more reluctantly than not, agree and subsequently face the ramifications on their personal lives as the show's production contrasts their former rock 'n' roll image with their now middle-class, suburban lifestyle. It soon becomes evident that Cate is probably the only remaining fan of the band, who, out of a personal interest in the matter, put her own career at stake.

Cast 
 Jennifer Love Hewitt as Cate, a record company executive, who wants to re-establish the band's claim to fame
 Donal Lardner Ward as Danny Moran, the Suburbans's lead singer 
 Craig Bierko as Mitch, the Suburbans's guitarist 
 Will Ferrell as Gil, the Suburbans's bass player 
 Tony Guma as Rory, the Suburbans's drummer 
 Ben Stiller as Jay Rose, a record company owner
 Jerry Stiller as Speedo Silverberg, a record company owner
 Amy Brenneman as Grace, Danny's girlfriend
 Bridgette Wilson as Lara, Rory's girlfriend 
 Perrey Reeves as Amanda
 Robert Loggia as Jules Marcelle
 David LaChapelle as Thorlakur
 J. J. Abrams as Rock Journalist
 Dick Clark as himself
 Kurt Loder as himself
 A Flock of Seagulls as themselves
 Brian Chlebowski as Kenny

See also 
Sugar Town, another "rock-and-roll and relationships" film released a month earlier, and called by Janet Maslin—in her review of The Suburbans—a "better and more ambitious recent film that [also, in retrospect] had no luck in finding an audience"

References

External links 
 
 
 
 Keith Bailey's review for The Unknown Movies Page

1999 films
1999 comedy-drama films
1990s English-language films
Films produced by J. J. Abrams
American comedy-drama films
TriStar Pictures films
Films set in 1998
1990s American films